Carol Dysinger is the co-director of Learning to Skateboard in a Warzone (If You're a Girl), for which she and Elena Andreicheva won the Best Documentary Short Subject at the 92nd Academy Awards in 2020.

Biography 
She had spent many years in Afghanistan beginning in the late 1970s during the Soviet invasion of Afganhistan, providing insight for her to work on the film. She currently serves as an associate professor at New York University.

References

External links 
 
Official Website

Living people
Year of birth missing (living people)
Directors of Best Documentary Short Subject Academy Award winners
American women film directors
21st-century American women